is a town in Ikoma District, Nara, Japan.

Ikaruga is home to Hōryū-ji and Hokki-ji, ancient Buddhist temples collectively inscribed as UNESCO World Heritage Sites. Other ancient temples include Hōrin-ji, also in the vicinity of Hōryū-ji. The town was named after the Palace of Prince Shōtoku, Ikaruga-no-Miya (Imperial Palace of Ikaruga, or Imperial House of Ikaruga), whose grounds were at Hōryū-ji, thus it is also called Ikaruga-dera (temple of Ikaruga).

As of 31 August, 2021, the town has an estimated population of 28,215, with 11,308 households.

Neighboring municipalities 
 Nara Prefecture
 Ikoma
 Yamatokōriyama
 Sangō
 Heguri
 Ando
 Kawai
 Ōji

Geography 
Tatsuta River (Nara Prefectural Tatsuta Park)
Yamato River
Mount Matsuo

Education

Elementary schools
 Ikaruga Elementary School
 Ikarugahigashi Elementary School
 Ikaruganishi Elementary School

Junior high schools
 Ikaruga Junior High School
 Ikarugaminami Junior High School

High schools
 Hōryū-ji International High School

Notable places

Temples and shrines 
 Hōryū-ji
 Hokki-ji
 Hōrin-ji
 Chūgū-ji
 Kichiden-ji
 Mimuroyama
 Ikaruga Shrine
 Ryūta Shrine

Kofun 
 Fujinoki Kofun
 Kasuga Kofun
 Okanohara Kofun
 Terayama Kofun

Transportation

Rail 
West Japan Railway Company
Kansai Main Line (Yamatoji Line): Hōryūji Station

Road 
Japan National Route 25
Japan National Route 168

References

External links 

  

Towns in Nara Prefecture